Astrid Roelants (born 18 April 1983), known professionally as Ameerah, is a Belgian singer and songwriter based in Los Angeles, United States.

Early life 
Roelants was raised by adoptive parents in Leuven, Flemish Brabant. She is of Tunisian and Algerian descent.

Career 
She was eliminated before the live shows. In 2004, she competed to represent Belgium in the Eurovision Song Contest 2004 with the song "Don't Stop the Music", placing seventh in the national final. With the song she achieved chart success in Belgium.

In 2009, her single "The Sound of Missing You" became an international hit, reaching number three on the Billboard Hot Dance Airplay chart in the United States. A remixed version by Wildboyz released in 2010 charted in Belgium, the Netherlands and Romania.

In 2010, Roelants appeared as a featured artist on the single "Freaky Like Me" by the Norwegian duo Madcon. The song charted in Austria, Belgium, Germany, Poland, Romania and the United Kingdom, and reached number one on the Norwegian singles chart. Roelants has also featured in songs by Regi, Turbo B and Schiller.

In November 2022, Roelants was announced as one of seven participants in Eurosong 2023, the Belgian national selection for the Eurovision Song Contest 2023. Her candidate entries "Armageddon" and "The Carnival" were both co-written with American singer-songwriter Zac Poor and produced by Morgan Taylor Reid. She ultimately selected "The Carnival" as her entry for the final, to be held on 14 January 2023.

Discography

Singles

As lead artist

As featured artist

References

1983 births
Living people
Belgian expatriates in the United States
Belgian people of Tunisian descent
Belgian people of Algerian descent
Belgian songwriters
Belgian women pop singers
Musicians from Leuven